Fever is the seventh studio album by Black Milk, released on February 23, 2018 on Mass Appeal Records. Black Milk went on tour to support the album in April 2018 with dates in Europe and the United States. The lead single from the album was "Laugh Now Cry Later".

Reception
Fever was met with "generally favorable" reviews from critics. At Metacritic, which assigns a weighted average rating out of 100 to reviews from mainstream publications, this release received an average score of 80 based on 7 reviews. Aggregator Album of the Year gave the release a 78 out of 100 based on a critical consensus of 7 reviews.

Pitchfork described the sound as "something like P-Funk meets the Ummah". 303 Magazine said the album was "so engrossing that it induces a thrill to speak its fresh tracks." Giving it 4/5 stars, the Guardian said "the vibe is gorgeous, featuring guttural but lithe bass and airy whispers of beats". The Detroit Free Press said that it's a "purposeful, progressive leap forward". The Washington Post described it as "pushing the envelope". The 405 suggested that the album was making an early claim for the best hip-hop album of the year. Detroit's Metro Times described Fever as "a diverse array of songs full of Hendrix soul and George Clinton funk". PopMatters said that for this album Black Milk "explores a spectrum of influences that includes jazz and electronica to produce a shifting-sand of styles that defy the genre trappings that have often ensnared lesser hip-hop act".

Track listing

Charts

References

2018 albums
Black Milk albums
Mass Appeal Records albums
Albums produced by Black Milk